James LeVoy Sorenson (July 30, 1921 – January 20, 2008) was an American businessman, the founder of Sorenson Companies, a parent company of 32 corporations. A noted philanthropist, he was the richest man in Utah with an estimated net worth of $4.5 billion at the time of his death. He donated his entire personal fortune to charity.

Early life 
Sorenson was born in Rexburg, Idaho, the son of Joseph LeVoy and Emma Blaser Sorenson, and was of Swedish, Norwegian and Swiss ancestry.

Career
With only a high school diploma, he made a fortune in local real estate before expanding in other directions such as innovative technology.  Sorenson holds roughly 60 patents, and is credited with a number of medical inventions including the disposable surgical mask and the disposable venous catheter.

One of his companies, Sorenson Genomics, has also begun a genetic database known as the Sorenson Molecular Genealogy Foundation, and claims to be the only laboratory in the world to have successfully identified victims in Thailand of the 2004 tsunami.

In 1982, Sorenson received the Golden Plate Award of the American Academy of Achievement.

In 2003, Sorenson was honored as the "Alumnus of the Year" by Sierra College in Rocklin, California, which he attended from 1940 to 1941. His pre-med studies were interrupted by World War II and a mission for the Church of Jesus Christ of Latter-day Saints.

On Wednesday, February 15, 2006, Sorenson received the "Giant of Our City" award in Salt Lake City for his philanthropy and effort in identifying the tsunami victims.

Upon his death, Sorenson donated his entire personal fortune to charity.

Personal life
He was married to Beverley Taylor Sorenson, a great granddaughter of LDS Church President John Taylor.  They had eight children — Carol Smith, Shauna Johnson, James Lee Sorenson, Ann Crocker, Joan Fenton, Joseph Sorenson, Gail Williamsen and Christine Harris.

Sorenson died on January 20, 2008, of cancer, aged 86. He was survived by a large extended family, including his wife, eight children and 47 grandchildren.

See also 
List of billionaires
Sorenson Molecular Genealogy Foundation

References

External links
Forbes.com: Forbes World's Richest People
Sorenson Companies/Sorenson Group Management
Deseret News bio
Sierra College alumni success stories
USA Today profile, Sorenson's last interview

1921 births
2008 deaths
American billionaires
American health care businesspeople
American Latter Day Saints
American Mormon missionaries in the United States
People from Rexburg, Idaho
Businesspeople from Salt Lake City
Deaths from cancer in Utah
20th-century Mormon missionaries
20th-century American philanthropists
20th-century American businesspeople